Pirate Party is a Bosnian political party within the region of Republika Srpska.

References

External links 
 Official Website
 
 

Republika Srpska
Political parties in Republika Srpska
2011 establishments in Bosnia and Herzegovina
Political parties established in 2011